Grimnir may refer to:

One of Odin's names, specifically the one he uses in Grímnismál (Sayings of Grímnir), see list of names of Odin
A character in the children's novel, The Weirdstone of Brisingamen
An "ancestor god" of the dwarfs in Warhammer Fantasy (setting)
Name of soul reapers for Goddess Hel in Runes books, YA novels by Ednah Walters
The fictional terrorist group that serves as the main antagonists of the Front Mission series.

See also 
 
 
 Grimnirson (surname)
 Grim (disambiguation)
 Grim (surname)
 Grimnitzsee